Sanjay Kirpal is a Fijian politician and Member of the Parliament of Fiji for the FijiFirst Party. He was elected to Parliament in the 2018 election. He is a registered Valuer by profession and has a valuation company named Professional Valuations Limited.
He has worked for Ministry of Lands and also attained degree in Bachelor of Arts in Land Management and Development.

References

Living people
Indian members of the Parliament of Fiji
FijiFirst politicians
Year of birth missing (living people)